The Belarus women's national under-20 basketball team is a national basketball team of Belarus, administered by the Belarusian Basketball Federation. It represented the country in women's international under-20 basketball competitions.

After the 2022 Russian invasion of Ukraine, the FIBA suspended Belarus from participating in basketball and 3x3 basketball competitions.

FIBA U20 Women's European Championship participations

See also
Belarus women's national basketball team
Belarus women's national under-18 basketball team

References

External links
Archived records of Belarus team participations

Basketball in Belarus
Basketball
Women's national under-20 basketball teams